Destination Paradise was the sixth studio album by Fischer-Z. The album saw a change of record label, and another completely different line-up, still with John Watts as the original member. The album featured several lyrics of John Watt's acute observations of political events. Following the release of the album, Watts as usual, toured and promoted the album extensively, which reportedly helped to garner a new generation of fans, and Destination Paradise has been regarded as a "dynamic and cinematic" album.

Track listing
All songs written by John Watts.

"Destination Paradise"
"Will You Be There?"
"Tightrope"
"Say When"
"Caruso"
"Marguerite Yourçenar"
"Saturday Night"
"Mockingbird Again"
"Still in Flames"
"Time for Rita"
"Of All The"
"Count to Ten"
"So Hard"
"Further from Love"

Personnel (as credited on CD)
John Watts - singing, strumming acoustics & bashing the occasional Telecaster
Hadji Wasner - riffing, twanging & twirling his electric guitar (and more)
Count Sinden von Sinden - bass guitar (for he is the...)
Dr. Smith - tickling, twinkling & caressing pianos, synthesizers & samplers
Steve "Svenson" Kellner - slapping, rimming & cracking a variety of drums & other percussive devices

Additional musicians 
Peter Gabriel - guest vocals
David Rhodes - guest vocals
Dame Alison Jiear - guest vocals
Pandit Danesh - (instrument not specified)
Simon Clarke - keyboards of a monstrous analogue nature, keyboard "marimba" man
Richard Evans - mandolin (to be mixed louder please)
Miles Bould - percussion (in tandem with Svenson)
Phil Spalding- bass
Carol Steele - percussion
Alex Gifford - saxophone & New Orleans brass arrangement
Sid Gauld - trumpet
Miles Gauld - tambourine
Chris Lawrence - trombone
Jody Linscott - Latin percussion
Roger Boulton - enchanting on heavenly strings
Graeme Pleeth - keyboards
Luke Cresswell - "no dustbins percussion"
Helena Paul - "time to dream vocals"
Dean Speedwell Brodrick - string arrangement

References 

1992 albums
Fischer-Z albums